Antônio Almeida (born 2 December 1910, date of death unknown), known as Bahia, was a Brazilian footballer. He played in four matches for the Brazil national football team in 1937. He was also part of Brazil's squad for the 1937 South American Championship.

References

External links
 

1910 births
Year of death missing
Brazilian footballers
Brazil international footballers
Place of birth missing
Association football forwards
Esporte Clube Bahia players
Madureira Esporte Clube players
CR Vasco da Gama players